Richard Reader (8 November 1890–1974) was an English footballer who played in the Football League for Bristol City, Derby County and Luton Town.

References

1890 births
1974 deaths
English footballers
Association football forwards
English Football League players
Belper Town F.C. players
Leicester City F.C. players
Derby County F.C. players
Bristol City F.C. players
Luton Town F.C. players